The 2007–08 Singapore Slingers season was the 2nd season of the franchise in the National Basketball League (NBL). 

The Singapore Slingers were the only Asian team to compete in Australia's National Basketball League (NBL). The Slingers play their home games at the 10,000 seat Singapore Indoor Stadium in Kallang, Singapore. On 17 September 2007, the Singapore Slingers signed their main sponsorship with CLSA Asia-Pacific Markets on a 12-month deal, with an option to extend an additional year.

Roster

Free agency

Re-signed

Additions

Subtractions

Depth chart 

*Note: Matt McQuade's Analysis - Singapore.

Regular season 

The regular season of the National Basketball League consisted of 30 games. Slinger's will play 15 home games and 15 away games. The Slingers opening match is against the Melbourne Tigers at Singapore's home which is the Singapore Indoor Stadium.

Ladder 
This is the ladder at the end of season, before the finals. The top 8 teams qualified for the finals series.

The NBL tie-breaker system as outlined in the NBL Rules and Regulations states that in the case of an identical win-loss record, the results in games played between the teams will determine order of seeding.

Regular season 

|- style="background-color:#ffcccc;"
| 1
| 19 September
| Melbourne
| L 94–117
| Ben Knight (20)
| Ben Knight (9) 
| Shane McDonald (4)
| Singapore Indoor Stadium
| 0–1
|- style="background-color:#ffcccc;"
| 2
| 23 September
| @ Perth
| L 112–80
| Mike Helms (23)
| Ben Knight (10)
| Mike Helms (4)
| Challenge Stadium
| 0–2
|- style="background-color:#ffcccc;"
| 3
| 26 September
| Gold Coast
| L 93–99
| Mike Helms (27)
| Ben Knight (9)
| Mike Helms (3)
| Singapore Indoor Stadium
| 0–3

|- style="background-color:#ccffcc;"
| 4
| 2 October
| Townsville
| W 101–86
| Rod Grizzard (32)
| Ben Knight (13)
| Grizzard, Helms, McDonald (3)
| Singapore Indoor Stadium
| 1–3
|- style="background-color:#ffcccc;"
| 5
| 13 October
| @ Gold Coast
| L 97–82
| Mike Helms (21)
| Mike Helms (8)
| Shane McDonald (3)
| Gold Coast Convention Centre
| 1–4
|- style="background-color:#ffcccc;"
| 6
| 14 October
| @ Brisbane
| L 127–106
| Chris Cameron (24)
| Rod Grizzard (13)
| Grizzard, Helms (5)
| Brisbane Convention Centre
| 1–5
|- style="background-color:#ffcccc;"
| 7
| 17 October
| Melbourne
| W 96–105
| Mike Helms (21)
| Ben Knight (9)
| Rod Grizzard (7)
| Singapore Indoor Stadium
| 1–6
|- style="background-color:#ffcccc;"
| 8
| 21 October
| New Zealand
| L 99–116
| Rod Grizzard (25)
| Blagoj Janev (10)
| Mike Helms (7)
| Singapore Indoor Stadium
| 1–7
|- style="background-color:#ffcccc;"
| 9
| 28 October
| Sydney
| L 90–99
| Mike Helms (31)
| Grizzard, Knight (9)
| Mike Helms (3)
| Singapore Indoor Stadium 
| 1–8

|- style="background-color:#ccffcc;"
| 10
| 4 November
| Perth
| W 112–105
| Mike Helms (44)
| Ben Knight (14)
| Mike Helms (4)
| Singapore Indoor Stadium
| 2–8
|- style="background-color:#ffcccc;"
| 11
| 8 November
| @ New Zealand
| L 98–92
| Rod Grizzard (25)
| Grizzard, Helms, Knight (7)
| John Fitzgerald (4)
| North Shore Events Centre
| 2–9
|- style="background-color:#ffcccc;"
| 12
| 11 November
| Adelaide
| L 93–111
| Rod Grizzard (27)
| Ben Knight (16)
| Grizzard, Helms (2)
| Singapore Indoor Stadium
| 2–10
|- style="background-color:#ffcccc;"
| 13
| 17 November
| @ Townsville
| L 110–98
| Rod Grizzard (28)
| Ben Knight (9)
| Shane McDonald (4)
| Townsville Entertainment Centre
| 2–11
|- style="background-color:#ffcccc;"
| 14
| 18 November
| @ Brisbane
| L 109–90
| Rod Grizzard (18)
| Rod Grizzard (9)
| Cameron, Knight, McDonald (3)
| Brisbane Convention Centre
| 2–12
|- style="background-color:#ffcccc;"
| 15
| 25 November
| @ South
| L 109–90
| Rod Grizzard (26)
| Grizzard, Knight (9)
| Rod Grizzard (4)
| Vodafone Arena
| 2–13
|- style="background-color:#ffcccc;"
| 16
| 28 November
| @ West Sydney
| L 126–95
| Grizzard, Helms (22)
| Ben Knight (11)
| Allen, Helms (3)
| State Sports Centre
| 2–14

|- style="background-color:#ccffcc;"
| 17
| 2 December
| Brisbane
| W 119–102
| Mike Helms (31)
| Grizzard, Knight (11)
| Rod Grizzard (6)
| Singapore Indoor Stadium
| 3–14
|- style="background-color:#ffcccc;"
| 18
| 5 December
| @ Wollongong
| L 93–72
| Mike Helms (20)
| Grizzard, Knight (11)
| Rod Grizzard (4)
| WIN Entertainment Centre
| 3–15
|- style="background-color:#ffcccc;"
| 19
| 8 December
| @ Townsville
| L 117–105
| Mike Helms (34)
| Rod Grizzard (10)
| Allen, Grizzard, Knight (4)
| Townsville Entertainment Centre
| 3–16
|- style="background-color:#ffcccc;"
| 20
| 15 December
| @ Adelaide
| L 104–77
| Rod Grizzard (25)
| Cameron, Donaldson, Fitzgerald, Grizzard (7)
| Mike Helms (4)
| Adelaide Arena
| 3–17
|- style="background-color:#ffcccc;"
| 21
| 19 December
| West Sydney 
| L 99–113
| Rod Grizzard (21)
| Ben Knight (7)
| Grizzard, McDonald (4)
| Singapore Indoor Stadium
| 3–18
|- style="background-color:#ccffcc;"
| 22
| 21 December
| @ Cairns
| W 89–93
| Mike Helms (17)
| Ben Knight (14)
| Grizzard, McDonald (5)
| Cairns Convention Centre
| 4–18
|- style="background-color:#ffcccc;"
| 23
| 22 December
| @ Gold Coast
| L 91–86
| Rod Grizzard (22)
| Rod Grizzard (11)
| Mike Helms (8)
| Gold Coast Convention Centre
| 4–19

|- style="background-color:#ffcccc;"
| 24
| 2 January 
| Perth
| L 87–124
| Blagoj Janev (20)
| Rod Grizzard (11)
| Rod Grizzard (3)
| Singapore Indoor Stadium
| 4–20
|- style="background-color:#ccffcc;"
| 25
| 13 January
| Wollongong
| W 113–102
| Mike Helms (28)
| Ben Knight (11)
| Mike Helms (5)
| Singapore Indoor Stadium
| 5–20
|- style="background-color:#ffcccc;"
| 26
| 20 January
| Cairns
| L 87–99
| Mike Helms (26)
| Ben Knight (13)
| Shane McDonald (4)
| Singapore Indoor Stadium
| 5–21
|- style="background-color:#ffcccc;"
| 27
| 26 January
| @ Melbourne
| L 115–82
| Rod Grizzard (21)
| Ben Knight (9)
| Allen, Cameron, Fitzgerald, McDonald (2)
| State Netball and Hockey Centre
| 5–22
|- style="background-color:#ccffcc;"
| 28
| 30 January
| South
| W 108–93
| Rod Grizzard (25)
| Rod Grizzard (14)
| Helms, McDonald (6)
| Singapore Indoor Stadium
| 6–22

|- style="background-color:#ffcccc;"
| 29
| 9 February 
| @ Sydney
| L 113–84
| Rod Grizzard (16)
| Ben Knight (10)
| Mike Helms (5)
| Sydney Entertainment Centre
| 6–23
|- style="background-color:#ffcccc;"
| 30
| 13 February
| Adelaide
| L 97–126
| Mike Helms (35)
| Ben Knight (16)
| Rod Grizzard (7)
| Singapore Indoor Stadium
| 6–24

Awards

Singapore Slingers Awards 
 Most Valuable Player: Mike Helms

2007–08 NBL All-Star Game 

 World All-Star: Rod Grizzard – 19 points, 8 rebounds, 2 assists and 1 steal vs. Aussie All-Stars @ State Netball and Hockey Centre

See also 

 2007–08 NBL season
 Singapore Slingers

References

External links 

 Official Website

Singapore Slingers season
Singapore Slingers seasons